The Hamgyong Mountains (Hamgyeong Sanmaek), officially known as the Gangbaekjeonggan and formerly known as the  or , is a North Korean mountain range. Its northern terminus is in the Tumen Valley. To its west are the Kaema Highlands.

Overall, the Hamgyongs are the highest range of mountains on the peninsula. The tallest mountain in the range is Kwanmo Peak (2,540 m), the second-highest after Paektu (China's "Changbai"). Other notable peaks include Du Peak (2,396 m), Gwesang Peak (2,333 m) and Mount Dury (2,303 m). In total, ten major peaks and 62 subsidiary peaks of the mountains in this range are 2,000 m or higher.


See also
 North & South Hamgyong Provinces, which take their names from the range

References

Citations

Bibliography
 .
 .
 .
 .
 .

Mountain ranges of North Korea